The Sportpalast speech or Total War speech was a speech delivered by German Propaganda Minister Joseph Goebbels at the Berlin Sportpalast to a large, carefully selected audience on 18 February 1943, as the tide of World War II was turning against Nazi Germany and its Axis allies. The speech is particularly notable as Goebbels almost mentions the Holocaust, when he begins saying "Ausrotten" (using the German word for extermination), but quickly changes it to Ausschaltung (i.e. exclusion). This was the same word Heinrich Himmler used on 18 December 1941, when he recorded the outcome of his discussion with Adolf Hitler on the Final Solution, wherein he wrote "als Partisanen auszurotten" ("exterminate them as partisans").

It is considered the most famous of Joseph Goebbels's speeches.  The speech was the first public admission by the Nazi leadership that Germany faced serious dangers. Goebbels called for a total war (German: totalen Krieg) to secure victory over the Allies, and exhorted the German people to continue the war even though it would be long and difficult because—as he asserted—both Germany's survival and the survival of a non-Bolshevist Europe were at stake.

Background

After the Axis defeat in late 1942 at the Second Battle of El Alamein in Egypt, a turning point of World War II in Europe occurred on 2 February 1943 as the Battle of Stalingrad ended with the surrender of Field Marshal Friedrich Paulus and the German 6th Army to the Soviets. At the Casablanca Conference in January, Franklin D. Roosevelt and Winston Churchill had demanded Germany's unconditional surrender, and the Soviets, encouraged by their victory, were beginning to retake territory, including Kursk (8 February), Rostov-on-Don (14 February), and Kharkiv (16 February). After the Axis defeats in Egypt and the subsequent loss of Tripoli (23 January, 1943), military setbacks shook Axis morale. In the Pacific, the Americans had just completed their months-long reconquest of Guadalcanal.

Adolf Hitler responded with the first measures that would lead to the all-out mobilization of Germany. Prior to the speech, the government closed restaurants, clubs, bars, theatres, and luxury stores throughout the country so that the civilian population could contribute more to the war.

Setting and audience
The setting of the speech in the Sportpalast placed the audience behind and under a big banner bearing the all-capital words "TOTALER KRIEG – KÜRZESTER KRIEG" ("total war – shortest war") along with Nazi banners and Nazi swastikas, as seen in pictures and film of the event.

Although Goebbels claimed that the audience included people from "all classes and occupations" (including "soldiers, doctors, scientists, artists, engineers and architects, teachers, white collars"), the propagandist had carefully selected his listeners to react with appropriate fanaticism. Goebbels said to Albert Speer that it was the best-trained audience one could find in Germany. However, the enthusiastic and unified crowd response recorded in the written version is, at times, not fully supported by the recording.

Details
Goebbels reiterated three themes in the speech:

If the Wehrmacht was not in a position to counter the danger from the Eastern front, the German Reich would fall to Bolshevism and the rest of Europe shortly afterwards.
The Wehrmacht, the German people and the Axis Powers alone had the strength to save Europe from this threat.
Danger was at hand, and Germany had to act quickly and decisively.

In the speech, Goebbels elaborated at length what Nazi propaganda asserted was the threat posed by so-called International Jewry: "The goal of Bolshevism is Jewish world revolution. They want to bring chaos to the Reich and Europe, using the resulting hopelessness and desperation to establish their international, Bolshevist-concealed, capitalist tyranny." Rejecting the protests of enemy nations against the Reich's Jewish policies, he stated, to deafening chants from the audience, that Germany "intends to take the most radical measures, if necessary, in good time."

While Goebbels referred to Soviet mobilization nationwide as "devilish", he explained that "we cannot overcome the Bolshevist danger unless we use equivalent, though not identical, methods [in a] total war". He then justified the austerity measures enacted, explaining them as temporary measures.

Historically, the speech is important in that it marks the first admission by the Party leadership that they were facing problems, and launched the mobilization campaign that, arguably, prolonged the war, under the slogan: "And storm, break loose!".
Goebbels claimed that no German was thinking of any compromise and instead that "the entire nation is only thinking about a hard war".

Goebbels attempted to counter reports in the Allied press that German civilians had lost faith in victory by asking the audience a number of questions at the end, such as:

Do you believe with the Führer and us in the final total victory of the German people?
Are you and the German people willing to work, if the Führer orders, 10, 12 and if necessary 14 hours a day and to give everything for victory?
Do you want total war? If necessary, do you want a war more total and radical than anything that we can even imagine today?

The recorded oral version of the speech differed in some ways from the written record. Especially significant is that in the oral (vs. written) record of the speech, Goebbels actually begins to mention the "extermination" of the Jews, rather than the less harsh terms used in the written version to describe the "solution", but catches himself in the middle of the word.

Quotes

The last line originated in the poem Männer und Buben (Men and Boys) by Carl Theodor Körner during the Napoleonic Wars. Körner's words had been quoted by Adolf Hitler in his 1920 speech "What We Want" delivered at Munich's Hofbräuhaus, but also by Goebbels himself in older speeches, including his 6 July 1932 campaign speech before the Nazis took power in Germany.

Regarding the word Ausschaltung there is a slight pause when Goebbels say Aussr... .Ausschaltung means elimination, which is fit in the context of the speech.

Reception
Millions of Germans listened to Goebbels on the radio as he delivered this speech about the "misfortune of the past weeks" and an "unvarnished picture of the situation." By amassing such popular enthusiasm, Goebbels wanted to convince Hitler into giving him greater powers in running the war economy. Hitler, however, was not yet ready to bring the economy to a total war footing over the objections of his ministers. On 23 July 1944, Goebbels was finally appointed Reich Plenipotentiary for Total War, responsible for maximising the manpower for the Wehrmacht and the armaments industry at the expense of sectors of the economy not essential to the war effort.

The speech also led to the spread of a late-war whisper joke, popular in Western Germany, especially the Ruhr:

References

Citations

Bibliography

External links
 English translation at Calvin University
 Original speech (in German) on the Internet Archive

1943 in Germany
Speeches by Nazis
1943 in international relations
Joseph Goebbels
February 1943 events
1943 speeches